Hold On, I'm Comin' is a live album by flautist Herbie Mann recorded in 1973 at the New York Jazz Festival, with one track from the Montreux Jazz Festival, and released on the Atlantic label.

Reception

The Allmusic site awarded the album 4 stars stating: "This is one of the best Herbie Mann recordings and arguably his most rewarding of the 1970s. ...The high quality of the solos and the spirited ensembles (which were inspired by the audience at the 1972 New York Jazz Festival) make this a generally memorable session".<ref name="Allmusic">{{Allmusic|first=Scott |last=Yanow |class=album |id=mw0000903381 |title=Hold On, I'm Comin''' – Review |accessdate=July 14, 2015}}</ref>

 Track listing All compositions by Herbie Mann except as indicated''
 "(Gimme Some of That Good Old) Soul Beat Momma" - 7:34
 "Never Can Say Goodbye" (Clifton Davis) - 4:34
 "Respect Yourself" (Luther Ingram, Mack Rice) - 8:50
 "Memphis Underground" - 13:04
 "Hold On, I'm Comin'" (Isaac Hayes, David Porter) - 4:08 
Recorded at the Pavillon Montreux in Switzerland on June 25 (track 3) and Yankee Stadium, NYC on July 8 (tracks 1, 2, 4 & 5), 1972

Personnel 
Herbie Mann - flute
David Newman - tenor saxophone, flute
Pat Rebillot - electric piano 
Sonny Sharrock - guitar
Andy Muson - bass
Reggie Ferguson - drums
Technical
Michael DeLugg, Stephan Sulke - recording engineer
Gene Paul - remix engineer
Katsuji Abe - photography

References 

Herbie Mann live albums
1973 live albums
Atlantic Records live albums
Albums recorded at the Montreux Jazz Festival